Shard or sherd is a sharp piece of glass, pottery or stone.

Shard may also refer to:

Places
 Shard End, a place in Birmingham, United Kingdom

Architecture
 Dresden Shard, a redesign of the Bundeswehr Military History Museum in Dresden, Germany
 The Shard, a skyscraper in London, United Kingdom

Arts, entertainment, and media
 Shard (comics), a character in the Marvel Comics universe
 Rex Shard, a character in SWAT Kats: The Radical Squadron
 "The Shard", a chapter in Mirror's Edge

Science and technology
 Shard (database architecture), a method of horizontal partitioning in a database
 Elytron or shard, a forewing found on some insect species

See also
 Lauren Bell (cricketer), nicknamed The Shard
 Shared (disambiguation)